19 Pashons - Coptic calendar - 21 Pashons

Fixed commemorations
All fixed commemorations below are observed on 20 Pashons (28 May) by the Coptic Orthodox Church.

Saints
Saint Amun (357 A.D.)

References
Coptic Synexarion

Days of the Coptic calendar